Tajikistan national under-17 football team is controlled by the Tajikistan National Football Federation and represents Tajikistan in international under-17 football competitions.

Recent Results & Schedule

2019 CAFA U-16 Championship

2020 AFC U-16 Championship qualification

FIFA U-17 World Cup record

*Denotes draws including knockout matches decided on penalty kicks.

AFC U-16 Championship record

*Denotes draws includes knockout matches decided on penalty kicks.

Past competition rosters

FIFA U-17 World Cup rosters
2007 FIFA U-17 World Cup
2019 FIFA U-17 World Cup

under-17
Asian national under-17 association football teams